Charles Jackson (1809–1882) was an English banker and antiquary.

Life
Born 25 July 1809, he came from a family connected with Doncaster, where both his grandfather and his father were mayor. He was the third son of the large family of James Jackson, banker, by Henrietta Priscilla, second daughter of Freeman Bower of Bawtry; John Edward Jackson was an elder brother. In 1829 he was admitted to Lincoln's Inn, and was called to the bar there in 1834.

Jackson settled as a banker at Doncaster. He was treasurer of the borough from 1838, and trustee of a number institutions, taking a large part in establishing the Doncaster free library. He suffered heavy losses in the bank failure of Overend, Gurney, & Co.

Jackson died at Doncaster 1 December 1882. By his marriage with a daughter of Hugh Parker of Woodthorpe, Yorkshire, he left four sons and four daughters.

Works
Jackson's major work was Doncaster Charities, Past and Present (1881, Worksop), which had been written long before. For the Surtees Society he edited:
 The Diary of Abraham de la Pryme, the Yorkshire Antiquary (1870);
 the Autobiography of Mrs. A. Thornton (1873); and 
 Yorkshire Diaries and Autobiographies of the 17th and 18th Centuries (1877)

He was engaged at the time of his death in editing for the society a memoir of the Priestley family.

Jackson also contributed to the Yorkshire Archæological Journal a paper on Sir Robert Swift and a memoir of the Rev. Thomas Broughton, as well as papers on local muniments (abstracts of deeds in the possession of James Montagu of Melton-on-the-Hill) and on the Stovin Manuscripts.

Notes

Attribution

1809 births
1882 deaths
English bankers
English barristers
English antiquarians
19th-century English lawyers
19th-century English businesspeople